The Omega interpreter is a strict pure functional programming interpreter similar to the Hugs Haskell interpreter. The syntax closely resembles that of Haskell but with important differences:
 Omega is strict (Hugs is lazy);
 Ability to introduce new kinds;
 Allows writing of functions at the type level.
Other differences are documented in the Omega user guide.

Omega was developed by Prof. Tim Sheard of Portland State University's Computer Science Department as a language with an infinite hierarchy of computational levels (value, type, kind, sort, etc.). The underlying concept is that data, and functions manipulating data, can be introduced at any level.

References

External links
 Ωmega download page

Free Haskell implementations